The 2000-2001 Western United States wildfires were a series of unusually severe wildfires that caused more than $2 billion (USD) in damage and resulted in the deaths of four firefighters.  Overall, 6,966,995 acres burned across the United States and 2.2 million of those acres were in Idaho and Montana alone.  A declaration of a state of emergency brought six military battalions and fire fighting teams from as far away as Australia and New Zealand to the Western United States.  Federal and state land management organizations recognize the fires as historic "both in extent and duration."  The ten year fire season average is 3.1 million acres.  The fires in 2000 destroyed more than double that acreage.  Nearly $900 million (USD) was spent fighting fires.  Long lasting ecological damage, including flooding, top soil runoff, and air quality damage has continues to this day.

The damage was particularly severe in the Bitterroot National Forest. One of the most stunning photos from these fires are two elk seeking shelter in the East Fork of the  Bitterroot River. The photo became known as Elk Bath.

References

 Lorch, Donatella, and Mark Matthews. "Flaming Fury." -Newsweek- 21 August 2000: 58-59.
 Engelbett, Phillis. "Wildfire." -Dangerous Planet The Science of Natural Disasters.- Vol.3. Ed. Phillis Engelbert. Detroit: The Gale Group, 2001

External links
Climate of 2000 - July Western U.S. Wildfires NOAA.
Northern Idaho and Western Montana Summer 2000 Wildfires (PDF) NOAA
A Report to the President In Response to the Wildfires of 2000 September 8, 2000 (PDF)

Wildfires in the United States
Wildfires in Idaho
Wildfires in Montana
2000 wildfires in the United States
2001 wildfires in the United States